Alfred-Henri Bramtot (1852, Paris – 16 June 1894) was a 19th-century French painter.

Biography 
A student at the École des Beaux-Arts de Paris in William Bouguereau's atelier, Alfred-Henri Bramtot won the Prix de Rome for painting in 1879 with La Mort de Démosthène. After his stay in Rome at Villa Medicis, he began a career as a painter and decorator. After competing unsuccessfully for the scenery of the town hall of Arcueil, he participated in the decoration of the council chamber of the town hall of Les Lilas in 1889 on the theme of the universal suffrage (See  here) In 1893, he  provided the cartoon to glassmaker master Félix Gaudin for the St. Catherine stained glass due to adorn one of the windows of the Sainte-Catherine church in Lille. He regularly exhibited at the Salon: he obtained a third class medal in 1876 and was out of competition after 1885. During the 1890s, he was also  a professor at the Académie Julian.

On 24 April 1886, The New York Times informed its readers of his picture Les Amis de Job exhibited at the Salon .

With Georges Duval (died in 1915), he was the author of many drawings intended for paper currency emissions for the French colonies.
He was master of drawing at the École polytechnique.

His Parisian studio was located at 3  in the 6th arrondissement.

List of paintings 
(partial list)

Bibliography 
 Catalogue premièrement des tableaux, études, dessins, etc. par Bramtot, deuxièmement des tableaux, aquarelles, dessins, pastels offerts à Mme Vve Bramtot par un comité d'artistes, expert : Eugène Féral, Paris, 1895 on Gallica.

References

External links 
 Notice on the site of the Académie Julian
  Alfred Henri Bramtot onMaster Paintings of the World

19th-century French painters
French male painters
Currency designers
École des Beaux-Arts alumni
Prix de Rome for painting
Academic staff of the Académie Julian
Painters from Paris
1852 births
1894 deaths
19th-century French male artists